The Scottish Executive Development Department (SEDD) was a civil service department of the Scottish Government from 1999 to 2007.

SEDD was responsible for the following areas in Scotland: social justice, housing, land use planning and building control. SEDD was directly responsible for various agencies of the Scottish Executive and other public bodies relating to these areas of responsibility.

Since early 2005 the Department was headed by Nicola Munro. The Minister for Communities was Rhona Brankin and she was assisted by the Deputy Minister for Communities, Des McNulty.

References

External links
 Official website

Defunct departments of the Scottish Government
Housing ministries
Spatial planning ministries
Town and country planning in Scotland
1999 establishments in Scotland
2007 disestablishments in Scotland